Petr Petrovich Troyanskii (January 1894 – 24 May 1950) was a Russian educator and scholar.

He was born into the family of a railway repair-shop worker in Orenburg in the Southern Urals. The family had fourteen children and the living was hard. He finished a parish school in Orenburg and passed gymnasia examinations without attending classes, after which he entered the University of St. Petersburg. He made his living by giving lessons. World War I prevented him from finishing university. After the Great October Revolution of 1917, he entered the Institute of Red Professors. Afterwards he taught social sciences and the history of science and technology at higher educational establishments. He also participated in compiling the Technical Encyclopedia and the Great Soviet Encyclopedia. In those years he devoted more and more time to putting into practice his idea of a translating machine. Stenocardia prevented him from completing the work on mechanising translation, which he considered the cause of his whole life.

References

 Bel’skaya, I. K. [И. К. Бельская], L. N. Korolev [Л. Н. Королев] and D. Yu. Panov [Д.Ю. Панов] (eds): 1959, Перeводная машина П. П. Троянского: сборник материалов о переводной машине для перевода с одного языка на другие, предложенной П. П. Троянским в 1933 г. [The translating machine of P. P. Troyanskii: collection of materials on a translating machine for the translation from one language into others, proposed by P. P. Troyanskii in 1933]. Изд. Акад. Наук СССР, Москва.
  Машина для подбора и печатания слов при переводе с одного языка на другой или на нескольких языках одновременно. А. с. СССР No. 40995, 1935. [Machine for selecting and typing words when translating from one language to another or across multiple languages simultaneously. USSR Patent 40995, 1935].

1894 births
1950 deaths
Soviet academics
Soviet inventors
Russian encyclopedists
Machine translation researchers
Institute of Red Professors alumni